Vik (Old Norse: vík) means wick or bay in Norwegian and Swedish (vig in Danish), and it may refer to the following:

Places

Iceland
Vík í Mýrdal, a village in southern Iceland

Iran
Vik, Iran, a village in Zanjan Province, Iran

Norway
Viken (Old Norse: Vík), historical district in southern Norway
Vik, a municipality in Vestland county
Vik or Vikøyri, a village in Vik municipality, Vestland county
Vik, Buskerud, a village in Hole municipality, Buskerud county
Vik, Grimstad, a village in Grimstad municipality, Aust-Agder county
Vik, Rogaland, a village in Karmøy municipality, Rogaland county
Vik, Sortland, a village in Sortland municipality, Nordland county
Vik, Sømna, a village in Sømna municipality, Nordland county
Vik, Sunnfjord, a village in Sunnfjord municipality, Vestland county
Vik, Trøndelag, a village in Flatanger municipality, Trøndelag county
Vik, Vestnes, a village in Vestnes municipality, Møre og Romsdal county
Vik Church, a church in Vik municipality, Vestland county
Vik Church (Flatanger), a church in Flatanger municipality, Trøndelag county

Sweden
Vik, Sweden, a village in Simrishamn Municipality in southernmost Sweden
Vik Castle, a castle in Uppland, Sweden

People
Vik (name), people with the first name of Vik or Vic
Vik (surname), people with the surname Vik

Other
Vik Records, an American record label set up in 1953 as a subsidiary of RCA
ViK. Recordings, a Canadian record label established in 1998
Stalag VI-K, a German World War II prisoner of war camp at Stuckenbrock

See also
Wick (disambiguation), the anglicisation of 'Vik'
Vic (disambiguation)